The Islamabad cricket team was a first-class cricket team based in Islamabad, Pakistan. Its home ground was the Diamond Club Ground. It participates in the Quaid-i-Azam Trophy. For Twenty20  and List A cricket the team is known as the Islamabad Leopards and participates in the National T20 Cup and National One-day Championship.

Islamabad was scheduled to play its first two first-class matches in the 1986-87 season in the BCCP President's Cup, but it conceded them without playing. It eventually made its first-class debut in 1992-93 in the Quaid-i-Azam Trophy, in which it has competed ever since, except for the 2002-03, 2003–04 and 2004–05 seasons.

As of mid-November 2013, Islamabad had played 163 matches, for 39 wins, 54 losses and 70 draws.

References

External links
 CricketArchive

Pakistani first-class cricket teams
Cricket Team